William Keller may refer to:

William Keller (Medal of Honor) (1876–1963), U.S. Army private and Medal of Honor recipient
William Duffy Keller (born 1934), judge
William F. Keller (born 1951), Pennsylvania politician
Bill Keller (born 1949), executive editor of The New York Times
Bill Keller (televangelist), American television evangelist and the host of Live Prayer
Billy Keller (born 1947), basketball player